Wedge (∧) is a symbol that looks similar to an in-line caret (^). It is used to represent various operations. In Unicode, the symbol is encoded  and by \wedge and \land in TeX. The opposite symbol (∨) is called a vel, or sometimes a (descending) wedge. Some authors who call the descending wedge vel often call the ascending wedge ac (the corresponding Latin word for "and", also spelled "atque"), keeping their usage parallel

Use 
Wedge is used to represent various operations:
 Logical conjunction in propositional logic and first-order logic
 Meet in lattice theory
 Exterior product or wedge product in differential geometry

See also

Turned v
Vel (symbol)
List of mathematical symbols
List of logic symbols
 Wedge (disambiguation)
 /\ (disambiguation)

References 

Logic symbols